Harry Jones (9 August 1911 – 19 July 1997) was a former Australian rules footballer who played with Collingwood in the Victorian Football League (VFL).

Notes

External links 

		
Harry Jones's profile at Collingwood Forever

1911 births
1997 deaths
Australian rules footballers from Victoria (Australia)
Australian Rules footballers: place kick exponents
Collingwood Football Club players
Brunswick Football Club players